Chance may refer to:

Mathematics and Science 
 In mathematics, likelihood of something (by way of the Likelihood function and/or Probability density function).
 Chance (statistics magazine)

Places 
 Chance, Kentucky, US
 Chance, Maryland, US
 Chance, Oklahoma, US
 Chance, South Dakota, US
 Chance, Virginia, US
 Chancé, a commune in Brittany, France

People
 Chance (name), a given name and surname
 Chance the Rapper (born 1993), Chicago hip hop recording artist
 Kamal Givens or Chance (born 1981), American rapper and reality-show contestant
 Chancellor, formerly Chance (born 1986), American singer-songwriter and record producer

Arts and entertainment

Film and television
 Chance (1984 film), a Russian science fiction comedy film
 Chance (1990 film), an action film starring Lawrence Hilton-Jacobs and Dan Haggerty
 Chance (2002 film), directed by and starring Amber Benson
 Chance (2009 film), directed by Abner Benaim
 Chance (2019 film), an American computer-animated film
 Chance (2020 film), starring Matthew Modine
 "Chance" (Fear Itself), a TV series episode
 Chance (TV series), a 2016 American thriller/drama television series

Music

Groups and labels
 Chance (band), an American country music group
 Chance Records, an American record label

Albums 
 Chance (Manfred Mann's Earth Band album)
 Chance (Candi Staton album)

Songs 
 "Chance" (Act song)
 "Chance" (Big Country song)
 "Chance!" (Koharu Kusumi song)
 "Chance" (Miho Komatsu song), 1998
 "Chance" (Sylvie Vartan song), 1963
 "Chance", by DC Talk from Intermission: the Greatest Hits
 "Chance" (Savatage song)
 "Chance!", by Uverworld from Timeless
 "Chance!", by Yui Asaka
 "A Chance", by Kenny Chesney
 "Chance" by Hayley Kiyoko from Panorama, 2022

Other arts and entertainment 
 Chance (Conrad novel), a 1913 novel by Joseph Conrad
 Chance (Parker novel), a 1996 novel by Robert B. Parker
 Chance (comics), two different characters from the Marvel Comics universe
 Chance, a space in the game Monopoly
 Life (video games), also sometimes called a chance

Other uses 
 Chance (philosophy) or indeterminism
 Chance (baseball), a defensive statistic
 Chance (ship), a number of ships of this name
 Chance, a celebrity Brahman bull whose clone was named Second Chance 
 Chance Brothers, a glass company
 Chance Rides, an amusement park ride and roller coaster manufacturer
 Optima Bus Corporation, formerly Chance Coach, Inc.

See also 

 Chances (disambiguation)
 Second Chance (disambiguation)
 Second Chances (disambiguation)